The King’s commissioner (abbreviated to CvdK) is the head of a province in the Netherlands. The officeholder chairs both the States Provincial (directly elected provincial legislature) and the Provincial Executive (executive branch), but has a right to vote only in the latter. When the reigning monarch is a female, the office is known as Queen's commissioner (Commissaris van de Koningin). As there are twelve provinces in the Netherlands, there are twelve King's commissioners.

There are two levels of local government in the Netherlands: the provinces and the municipalities. The twelve provinces form the tier of administration between central government and the municipalities. The three tiers are organised in largely the same way, with a directly elected legislature, which in turn chooses the executive branch, headed by an appointed chairman. At the national and municipal levels, these are the King and the Mayor; at the provincial level it is the King's commissioner.

Tasks of the King’s commissioner
The King’s Commissioner is not elected by the residents of the province, but appointed by the Dutch Crown (the ministers, presided over by the monarch), for a term of six years, renewable. The King’s Commissioner can be dismissed only by the Dutch Crown. When a vacancy arises, the provincial council gives the Minister of the Interior a profile of the kind of candidate it would like to see in the job. Although all King’s Commissioners are prominent members of one or another of the major national political parties, they are expected to be politically impartial while they are in office.

The King's Commissioners play a role within the provincial administration and are the official representatives of central government in the provinces. They coordinate disaster management and prevention and pay regular official visits to the municipalities in their region.

The King's Commissioners play an important part in the appointment of municipal mayors. When a vacancy arises, the King's Commissioner first asks the municipal council for its views as to a successor, then writes to the Minister of the Interior, recommending a candidate. Since the King's Commissioners are both the chairs and full members of the provincial executives, they may include some of the executive's tasks in their portfolio. They also oversee the official apparatus and any provincial utilities and represent the province in its dealings with business.

Naming practice in Limburg
In the Dutch province of Limburg, the King’s Commissioner is usually informally called Gouverneur ("governor"), as in Belgium. Similarly, the Provinciehuis ("Province Hall") at Maastricht is called Gouvernement ("Governor’s Residence"). This local custom arose from the particular status of the province in the nineteenth century. The official name of the office is currently the same as in the other provinces.

List of current King's commissioners

''Source:

See also
 :Category:Lists of King's and Queen's Commissioners in the Netherlands
 Lord-lieutenant

References 

Dutch monarchy
Government of the Netherlands
Gubernatorial titles
 
Politics of the Netherlands by province
Netherlands,provinces,king's commissioner